Kwizera Eudia was a Ugandan politician and social worker. A member of the National Resistance Movement (NRM) party, she served in the eighth Parliament of Uganda representing Kisoro District.

Education 
She had a Certificate and Bachelors' Degree in Counselling.

Career life before death 
She died in 2017 at the age of 60s from Nsambya Hospital in Kampala. Kwizera was said to have  died after a short illness. Before her death, she served as the Woman member of Parliament in the eighth Parliament of Uganda for Kisoro District from 2006 to 2011 before Sarah Mateke Nyirabashitsi, the daughter of the State Minister, Philemon Mateke took over as the MP of Kisoro District. Kwizera was buried at her ancestral home in Rubugiru Town Council in Kisoro District. 

Before her political career, she was also employed as the grassroots mobilizer at Compassion International. She was a member of Executive Board at African Queens and Women Cultural Leaders Network. Eudia, had only one son named Michael Kwizera.

During the African MP meeting in Kenya, she encouraged  African leaders to ensure the improvement of food production alongside processing and marketing.

See also 

 Sarah Mateke Nyirabashitsi
 List of members of the eighth Parliament of Uganda

References 

2017 deaths
Members of the Parliament of Uganda
Women members of the Parliament of Uganda
National Resistance Movement politicians
People from Kisoro District
Parliament of Uganda